Fight Test is an extended play (EP) released by the Flaming Lips released on Warner Bros. Records in 2003. The single version of "Fight Test" was released on June 23, 2003, peaking at number 28 on the UK Singles Chart. It is the third single to be picked from the album Yoshimi Battles the Pink Robots.

It is an enhanced CD, containing covers of Radiohead's "Knives Out", Kylie Minogue's "Can't Get You Out of My Head", and Beck's "The Golden Age". In addition, the EP includes two original songs. The UK version was a normal CD single, which also featured some previously unreleased songs. Fight Test was nominated for Best Alternative Album at the 46th Annual Grammy Awards.

Plagiarism settlement
"Fight Test" is similar to Cat Stevens's 1970 song "Father and Son". Following a settlement with the Flaming Lips, Stevens receives 75 per cent of the royalties from Fight Test. In an interview with The Guardian, front man Wayne Coyne stated

The opening of "Fight Test" ("The test begins...now") was sampled from one of the sync tests from the Flaming Lips' own Boombox Experiments. The song was also the theme song for the short-lived MTV cartoon 3 South. It was furthermore used in a season 2 episode of the long-running TV series Smallville.

Track listing

Enhanced CD content
 "Fight Test" video
 Christmas on Mars movie trailer

UK CD1
"Fight Test"
"Thank You Jack White (for the Fiber-Optic Jesus That You Gave Me)"
"The Deterioration of the Fight or Flight Response"

UK CD2
"Fight Test"
"The Strange Design of Conscience"
"Fight Test" (primitive demo with helium voice)

UK DVD
"Fight Test" (video)
"Fight Test" (audio)
"Knives Out" (from July 2002 XFM session)
"One More Robot" (from July 2002 XFM session)

Chart positions

EP

Single

References

2003 EPs
Warner Records EPs
The Flaming Lips EPs
Songs involved in plagiarism controversies
Albums produced by Dave Fridmann
Albums involved in plagiarism controversies